Badenhard is an Ortsgemeinde – a municipality belonging to a Verbandsgemeinde, a kind of collective municipality – in the Rhein-Hunsrück-Kreis (district) in Rhineland-Palatinate, Germany. It belongs to the Verbandsgemeinde Hunsrück-Mittelrhein having its administration in Emmelshausen.

Geography

Location
Badenhard is located on a high ridge in the east Hunsrück, between the Middle Rhine valley and the Autobahn A 61.

Neighbouring municipalities
Next to Badenhard there are Utzenhain and Birkheim.

History
The feudal landholders were until the French occupation in 1794 the Counts of Katzenelnbogen and the Landgraviate of Hesse. In 1815, Badenhard was assigned to the Kingdom of Prussia at the Congress of Vienna. In 1908, the building of the local church was financed by a local woman. Since 1946, it has been part of the then newly founded state of Rhineland-Palatinate.

Religion
The municipality’s majority is Evangelical.

Politics

Municipal council
The council is made up of 6 council members, who were elected by majority vote at the municipal election held on 7 June 2009, and the honorary mayor as chairman.

Mayor
Badenhard’s mayor is Dirk Jost.

Coat of arms
The German blazon reads: 

The municipality’s arms might in English heraldic language be described thus: In the split shield above in gold three oak leaves next to next, the bottom in blue with two silver ears of wheat argent.

The Ortsgemeinde of Badenhard is even today a community well defined by agriculture and forestry. The oakleaves refer to the broadleaf forests, and the ears of wheat to agriculture. While the charges refer to the municipality itself, the tinctures refer to the old feudal landholders, the Counts of Katzenelnbogen and the Landgraviate of Hesse.

Culture and sightseeing

Buildings
In the following are listed buildings or sites in Rhineland-Palatinate’s Directory of Cultural Monuments:
 Evangelical church, Schloßstraße 1 – Baroque Revival-Art Nouveau building with T-shaped floor plan, 1908/1909

Economy and infrastructure

Transport
Badenhard is located only a few kilometres away from Autobahn A 61.

References

Municipalities in Rhineland-Palatinate
Rhein-Hunsrück-Kreis